Adarsh Liberal (an Ideal Liberal) is a respective term used on social media in India to describe a person who opposes the anti-minority hate policies of the Modi Government. The term came to be used on social media after the term Andh Bhakt became popular to describe a person who blindly supports the policies of the Modi Government. 

According to a poster released on social media, Adarsh Liberal is  "someone who goes to any extend to discuss and respond to controversial policies of Right Wing Brahminical Supremacist Government", and a person who "supports Human Rights ",  etc.

See also

 Limousine liberal
 Pseudo-secular
 Chardonnay socialist

References

Political metaphors referring to people
Hindi words and phrases
Internet trolling
Internet slang